Claudie (André-Deshays) Haigneré (born 13 May 1957) is a French doctor, politician and former astronaut with the Centre National d'Études Spatiales (1985–1999) and the European Space Agency (1999–2002).

Background and training 
Born in Le Creusot, Claudie Haigneré studied medicine at the Faculté de Médecine (Paris-Cochin) and Faculté des Sciences (Paris-VII). She went on to obtain certificates in biology and sports medicine (1981), aviation medicine and space medicine (1982), and rheumatology (1984). In 1986 she received a diploma in the biomechanics and physiology of movement (1986) and received her doctorates in rheumatology (1984) and neuroscience (1992).

Space career 

Out of 10,000 candidates, France's space center selected only six men and one woman: Claudie Haigneré. She first qualified as an engineer and emergency pilot to the Space Shuttle. She first served as a back-up crew member for the 1993 Mir Altaïr mission in which her future husband Jean-Pierre Haigneré participated. The asteroid 135268 Haigneré is named in their combined honour. In 1994, Claudie Haigneré began training at the Yuri Gagarin Cosmonaut Training Center in Star City, Russia, for the Franco-Russian Cassiopée mission and learned Russian during her time there. On 17 August 1996, she became the first French woman to go to space as she and two Russian cosmonauts, commander Valery Korzun and flight engineer Aleksandr Kaleri, launched into space aboard the Soyuz TM-24 on the Russian-French Cassiopée mission. While on the mission, visited the Mir space station for 16 days and she conducted comprehensive experiments in the fields of physiology and development biology, fluid physics and technology. In 1999, Haigneré commanded a Soyuz capsule during reentry and became the first woman qualified to do so. As the flight engineer on Soyuz TM-33 in 2001, she became the first European woman to visit the International Space Station. After the mission, Claudie Haigneré continued her involvement in space science by attending scientific workshops and conferences. She also contributed to data analysis and constructions for the scientific programs of future projects. She eventually retired from ESA on 18 June 2002.

Political career 
Following her career as an astronaut, Claudie Haigneré entered French politics in Jean-Pierre Raffarin's government. She was minister delegate for Research and New Technologies from 2002 to 2004 and succeeded Noëlle Lenoir as minister delegate for European Affairs from 2004 to 2005.

Organizational involvement 
Haigneré was named as the founding director of Universcience in 2009.  At that time, she was an advisor to the Director General of the ESA.  In 2015, Haigneré resumed serving as a special advisor to ESA's Director General.

Claudie Haigneré  recently accepted the position to chair the Jury of the DStv Eutelsat Star Awards, which is an annual pan-African student competition in which students  write an essay or create a poster focusing on science and technology fields as a source of inspiration to unlock opportunities for Africa. The essays and posters will then be judged by an international panel of industry experts, government and academic world members, based on accuracy, creativity, originality and innovation. Claudie Haigneré's acceptance of this assignment marks the first time a woman has served on the panel for the DStv Eutelsat Star Awards.

Honours 

Claudie Haigneré received many special honors for her spaceflight career. She received the Chevalier of the Légion d'Honneur as well as the Chevalier of the Ordre National du Mérite. To recognize her outstanding involvement in the Franco-Russian space cooperation, she received the Russian Order of Friendship. She also received the Russian Medal "For Merit in Space Exploration" and "Medal for Personal Valour".

Claudie Haigneré is also an honorary member of the Société Française de Médecine Aéronautique et Spatiale and the Association Aéronautique et Astronautique de France (AAAF). She also holds membership in the International Academy of Astronautics (IAA) and of the Académie de l'Air et de l'Espace (ANAE).

There are streets named after her in the French towns of Claira, Franqueville-Saint-Pierre, Marignane, Mudaison and Valliquerville.

References 

Other sources
 Flitner, Bettina: Frauen mit Visionen – 48 Europäerinnen (Women with visions – 48 Europeans). With texts by Alice Schwarzer. Munich: Knesebeck, 2004. , p. 108–111

External links 
 ESA profile page
 The Andromede mission on the ESA website
Claudie Haigneré photographed by Bettina Flitner 

1957 births
Living people
People from Le Creusot
Politicians of the French Fifth Republic
French spationauts
Women astronauts
Physician astronauts
ESA astronauts
Astronaut-politicians
Commandeurs of the Légion d'honneur
Knights of the Ordre national du Mérite
Recipients of the Medal "For Merit in Space Exploration"
European amateur radio operators
Amateur radio women
Amateur radio people
20th-century French women scientists
20th-century French women politicians
Women government ministers of France
Mir crew members